The Brown House is a historic house at 384 Tremont Street in Rehoboth, Massachusetts.  This -story wood-frame house has an unusual construction history.  According to a local history, at its core is a structure built in the early 18th century, which was significantly modified and extended in the late 19th century with vernacular Italianate styling.  The architectural evidence supports the idea that part of the house was in fact built in the 18th century.

The house was listed on the National Register of Historic Places in 1983.

See also
National Register of Historic Places listings in Bristol County, Massachusetts

References

Houses completed in 1700
Houses in Bristol County, Massachusetts
Buildings and structures in Rehoboth, Massachusetts
Houses on the National Register of Historic Places in Bristol County, Massachusetts
1700 establishments in Massachusetts